For information on all Middle Tennessee State University sports, see Middle Tennessee Blue Raiders

The Middle Tennessee Blue Raiders baseball team is a varsity intercollegiate athletic team of Middle Tennessee State University in Murfreesboro, Tennessee, United States. The team is a member of Conference USA, which is part of the National Collegiate Athletic Association's Division I. Middle Tennessee's first baseball team was fielded in 1912. The team plays its home games at Reese Smith Jr. Field in Murfreesboro, Tennessee. The Blue Raiders are coached by Jerry Meyers.

Blue Raiders in Major League Baseball
Since the Major League Baseball Draft began in 1965, Middle Tennessee has had 75 players selected.

See also
List of NCAA Division I baseball programs

References

External links
 

Sports clubs established in 1912